The 1998 Louisiana Tech Bulldogs football team was an American football team that represented Louisiana Tech University as an independent during the 1998 NCAA Division I-A football season. In their third year under head coach Gary Crowton, the team compiled an 6–6 record.

Schedule

References

Louisiana Tech Bulldogs
Louisiana Tech Bulldogs football seasons
Louisiana Tech Bulldogs football